"Cow Tools" is a cartoon from American cartoonist Gary Larson's The Far Side, published in October 1982. It depicts a cow standing in front of a table of bizarre, misshapen implements with the caption "Cow tools". The cartoon confused many readers, who wrote or phoned in seeking an explanation of the joke. In response to the controversy, Larson issued a press release clarifying that the thrust of the cartoon was simply that, if a cow were to make tools, they would "lack something in sophistication". It has been described as "arguably the most loathed Far Side strip ever" while also becoming a popular Internet meme.

Description 
"Cow Tools" is a single-panel cartoon depicting a cow standing on its hind legs at a table, with a barn in the background. On the table are four objects: one resembles a crude hand saw, while the others are more abstract. The caption simply reads "Cow tools".

Reactions 

Immediately upon the cartoon's publication, Chronicle Features, which syndicated The Far Side, was inundated with queries from readers and newspaper editors seeking an explanation of the cartoon. According to the general manager of Chronicle Features, "the phone never stopped ringing for two days." Larson himself received hundreds of letters about "Cow Tools", some of which were reprinted in the 1989 anthology The Prehistory of The Far Side. In one letter, a reader from Texas wrote that they had shown the cartoon to "40-odd professionals with doctoral degrees", and none could understand it.

Reflecting on the cartoon's reception, Larson suggested he had erred in making one of the tools resemble a crude saw, which misled many readers into believing that to understand the cartoon's message, they needed to decipher the identities of the other three tools.

Several decades after its release, the cartoon became a popular Internet meme.

Explanation 
Larson took the unusual step of issuing a press release, explaining the joke:

The cartoon was intended to be an exercise in silliness. While I have never met a cow who could make tools, I felt sure that if I did, they (the tools) would lack something in sophistication and resemble the sorry specimens shown in this cartoon.
I regret that my fondness for cows, combined with an overactive imagination, may have carried me beyond what is comprehensible to the average Far Side reader.

Years later, in The Prehistory of the Far Side, Larson further explained that he was inspired by the idea that tool use was the characteristic that separated mankind from the rest of the animal kingdom.

See also 
 Tool use by animals

References

External links 

Individual printed cartoons
The Far Side
1982 works
Cattle in art
1982 in comics